Perochak is a Town in Sialkot District, Punjab Province, Pakistan. This road played an important role in the Indo-Pakistani War of 1965, providing a shortcut to the battlefield during the Battle of Chawinda.

The Town has a population of approximately 11,500 people.

Education
There are two Govt. Education institutions. Govt. H/S for Boys and Govt. H/S for Girls.

References

External links
Perochak community forum

Villages in Sialkot District